A blunder refers to a "stupid, careless mistake". Specific instances include:
 Blunder (chess), a very poor move in chess
 Hopetoun Blunder, an event in Australian history
 Brand blunder, in marketing
 Draft blunder, in American sports
 Himalayan Blunder, in Indian history

Television 
 Blunder (TV series), a British comedy programme first shown on E4 in 2006

See also 
There are various colloquial terms, as a rule with slightly different connotations, for various forms and contexts of blunder. For example:
 Boner, which has been used both as a synonym for "howler" and for more material blunders